William Quatremaine or Quatremain (c. 1618 – 11 June 1667) was an English physician who served  King Charles II in exile and a politician who sat in the House of Commons from 1662 to 1667.

Quatremaine was educated at Pembroke College, Oxford, and on 23 June 1657  took the degree of Doctor of Physic. At the beginning of 1658 he helped the Marquis of Ormonde return to France after the Marquis had made a secret journey to England on behalf of the King. Ormonde recommended Quatremain to Sir Edward Hyde in very strong terms and as a result Quatremaine went to Flanders to be physician to King Charles II. After the restoration, he practiced in Lewes after marrying into a Sussex family. In 1661 he was elected to the Royal Society.
 
Quatremaine was elected Member of Parliament (MP) for New Shoreham in 1662 and held the seat until his death in 1667.

References

English MPs 1661–1679
1610s births
1667 deaths
Alumni of Pembroke College, Oxford
Original Fellows of the Royal Society